Marcel Tiemann (born 19 March 1974) is a retired racing driver from Germany. He is best known for being a five-time winner of the 24 Hours Nürburgring race with Opel and Porsche.

Career

Early series
Tiemann started his career in Formula König before moving to Formula Renault Germany. In 1994 he won the championship, and graduated to Formula 3. In 1996, Tiemann won the Formula 3 Monaco Grand Prix driving for Opel.

Sportscars

In 1997 Tiemann switched from single seaters to sportscars, and competed in the FIA GT1 Championship season for AMG. He won the round in Suzuka, and secured podiums at four other races. Returning for 1998, his best result was 2nd at Oschersleben.  

In 1999, he was entered to race at the Le Mans 24h endurance race. However, the Mercedes-Benz CLR he was driving was involved in two high profile accidents with Mark Webber driving, and the car was pulled out of the race.

In 2001, he drove for Zakspeed in V8Star Series finishing 2nd in the championship with two wins.

Tiemann began racing in America in 2005, where he joined the American Le Mans Series and Grand American Rolex Series.  In 2008, he scored his best finish in GrandAm at Watkins Glen driving for GM.

DTM
In 2000, Tiemann joined the Deutsche Tourenwagen Masters series with Team Persson driving a Mercedes CLK in Original-Teile livery. Over 16 races, Tiemann scored 53 points and finished 10th in the Championship.  In 2001, he switched to Manthey Racing, still driving a Mercedes, and over 3 races he scored his best finish in the series with 3rd at the Norisring. In 2002, Tiemann returned for 1 race at Hockenheim finishing 15th.

24 Hours Nürburgring
Tiemann's greatest successess have come in the 24 Hours Nürburgring. He won his first in 2003 in the E1-XP class with OPC Team Phoenix's Opel Astra V8. He returned with the same team in 2004 and finished in 10th, before switching to the A7 class with Manthey Racing in their Porsche for 2005. He would pilot the car to victory in 2006, the first of 4 back to back victories at the race; driving exclusively Manthey Porsche's.

Accident at Imola
In 2010, Tiemann joined the International GT Open driving an Audi R8. However, during the race at Imola on May 23, Tiemann collided with another car at the rolling start and was forced into a retaining wall at high speed. He sustained brain trauma, a fractured vertebra and broken ribs in the impact, and was placed in a medically induced coma to assist his recovery. He was moved to Germany, and later regained consciousness and mostly recovered, but has been unable to race due to the resulting neurological damage and other problems from the accident.

Racing record

Career Summary

Complete Deutsche Tourenwagen Masters results 
(key) (Races in bold indicate pole position) (Races in italics indicate fastest lap)

† — Retired, but was classified as he completed 90% of the winner's race distance.

24 Hours of Le Mans results

Personal life
Tiemann lives in Mallorca, Spain with his wife and two children. He previously lived in Monaco. Following retirement from racing, he is a brand ambassador for Mercedes Benz and also runs a construction company building nursing homes in Germany. Tiemann's father is Hans-Jürgen Tiemann who won the 1997 and 1999 24 Hours Nürburgring races, the latter with Sabine Schmitz.

References

External links 
 http://www.marceltiemann.com/
 http://www.marceltiemann.de/

1974 births
Living people
Sportspeople from Hamburg
German racing drivers
German Formula Renault 2.0 drivers
Deutsche Tourenwagen Masters drivers
Nürburgring_24_Hours_drivers
24 Hours of Le Mans drivers
Speedcar Series drivers
American Le Mans Series drivers
European Le Mans Series drivers
Porsche Supercup drivers
International GT Open drivers
24 Hours of Spa drivers
Opel Team BSR drivers
Mercedes-AMG Motorsport drivers
Phoenix Racing drivers
Porsche Motorsports drivers